Wallace L. Minto (August 6, 1921 in Jersey City, New Jersey, United States – September 3, 1983) had a passion for science at a very young age.  For instance, at age 13, he and his father, Wallace Milton Minto, stock piled more than 50 tons of uranium rich ore in Sparta, New Jersey.  He was also the first to split the uranium atom while still a teenager.  This nearly created an atomic explosion in his family home. At age 16, Wallace synthesized radium and invented what is now known as "Scotchlite".  He had a copyright on his own periodic chart which renamed all the elements.

When only 16, he was a student at Columbia College and was later instrumental in convincing Albert Einstein to write a letter to President Franklin D. Roosevelt (dated August 2, 1939) stressing the need for the United States to expand its experimentation with Atomic Energy, leading to the Manhattan Project.  Consequently, Minto sold his uranium rich ore to the U.S. Government for use in the Manhattan Project.

On June 26, 1944, Minto was enlisted by Dr. Andrew H. Dowdy, director of the Manhattan Department of the University of Rochester, to take charge of the Special Problems Division of the Manhattan Project. Minto reported directly to General Leslie Groves and reportedly threw Groves out of his lab for tampering with his beakers.

Another significant accomplishment by Minto was a non-polluting, organic Rankine Cycle Engine. The engine was licensed to Nissan Motor Company in 1972. Minto also discovered the method by which fish communicate which is referenced in the July 1965 issue of Popular Mechanics.  Hydronics, a low form of radiation, was also discovered by Minto.  Furthermore, he invented the Jemeter, an electronic refractometer, utilized to distinguish gem stones.  Finally, Minto invented the Minto Wheel, as a gift to the Third World countries.  Its purpose was to replace the mundane task of oxen and mules walking around in circles in order to grind corn or wheat and for the operation of a low technology irrigation system.
Wallace Minto died on September 3, 1983, of myelofibrosis after a long battle. His disease was a direct result of his work on the Manhattan Project.

References

1921 births
1983 deaths
Columbia College (New York) alumni
20th-century American inventors
Manhattan Project people